'The Testament of Billions (German:Das Milliardentestament) is a 1920 German silent film directed by Franz Seitz.

Cast
 Lili Dominici 
 Ernst Rückert 
 Albert Steinrück 
 Fred Stranz

References

Bibliography
 Cees de Jong. Jan Tschichold: Master Typographer : His Life, Work & Legacy. Thames & Hudson, 2008.

External links

1920 films
Films of the Weimar Republic
Films directed by Franz Seitz
German silent feature films
German black-and-white films